The Dave Brubeck Quartet in Europe is a live album by pianist Dave Brubeck and his quartet recorded in 1958 in Copenhagen, Denmark. The cartoon on the cover of the album of Brubeck and his quartet was drawn by Arnold Roth.

Reception

Ken Dryden reviewed the album for Allmusic and wrote that "...the quartet is in top form, while Brubeck is hardly the heavy-handed pianist that many early critics claimed him to be on these rewarding performances" Dryden praised Paul Desmond's "lyricism and witty quotes especially of note in the extended treatment of the standard "Tangerine"".

Track listing 
 "Wonderful Copenhagen" (Frank Loesser)
 "My One Bad Habit" (Dave Brubeck, Iola Brubeck)
 "Tangerine" (Johnny Mercer, Victor Schertzinger)
 "The Wright Groove" (Eugene Wright)
 "Like Someone in Love" (Johnny Burke, Jimmy Van Heusen)
 "Watusi Drums" (D. Brubeck)

Personnel 
 Dave Brubeck – piano
 Paul Desmond – alto saxophone
 Eugene Wright – double bass
 Joe Morello – drums
 Arnold Roth – cover artwork

References

External links
 

1958 live albums
1950s in Copenhagen
Columbia Records live albums
Dave Brubeck live albums
Instrumental albums